Oliver Marach and Jürgen Melzer were the defending champions, but Melzer chose not to participate this year. Marach played alongside Raven Klaasen, but lost in the first round to Kevin Krawietz and Andreas Mies.

John Peers and Michael Venus won the title, defeating Ivan Dodig and Mate Pavić in the final, 6–3, 6–4.

Seeds

Draw

Draw

Qualifying

Seeds

Qualifiers
  Radu Albot /  Aisam-ul-Haq Qureshi

Lucky losers
  Marvin Möller /  Milan Welte

Qualifying draw

References

 Main draw
 Qualifying draw

Hamburg European Open - Doubles
2020 Hamburg European Open